"De Tha Xanagapiso" is a song performed by Stelios Kazantzidis. The lyrics are written by Lefteris Papadopoulos and music is composed by Manos Loizos. The English translation of the title is "I Shall not Love Again".

Lyrics 

 My share of joy
 is taken from me by others
 because I had pure hands
 and a great heart

 My god, the second time
 that I will come to live
 however much my heart yearns
 I shall not love again

 Like a sea-beaten ship's hull
 like a cracked rock
 I came into life as a stranger
 and as a stranger I will leave again
 — Singer: Stelios Kazantzidis, Songwriter: Lefteris Papadopoulos, Composer: Manos Loizos

Stelios Kazantzidis songs
Greek songs
Year of song missing